Alai or Alay may refer to:

Alai
 Alai (Cilicia), town of ancient Cilicia
 Alai (film), a 2003 Indian Tamil film starring Silambarasan
 Alai, Iran, a village in Hormozgan Province, Iran
 Alai (Enderverse), a character from Orson Scott Card's Ender's Game series
 Alai (author), an ethnic Tibetan Chinese author, author of Red Poppies
 Association Littéraire et Artistique Internationale ("International Literary and Artistic Association"), an international organization devoted to promotion of authors’ rights

Alay
 Alay Mountains
 Alay Valley
 Alay, Niğde, a town in the central district (Niğde) of Niğde Province, Turkey
 Sergey Alay (born 1965), Belarusian hammer thrower
 Alay, Indonesian SMS/internet slang